Alfred Kirwa Yego (born 28 November 1986 in Eldoret) is a Kenyan middle-distance runner who specializes in the 800 metres. He is best known for winning the gold medal in the 800 m at the 2007 World Championships.

Yego competed at the 2005 World Championships, but did not advance past 800 metres heats.

His coach is Claudio Berardelli, who has also coached olympic medalists Janeth Jepkosgei and Nancy Lagat
Yego won the silver at the 2009 World Championships in the 800 m. A few weeks afterwards, he improved his 800 m personal best to 1:42.67 min in Rieti, finishing second behind David Rudisha who ran a new African record.

Achievements

Personal bests
 800 metres – 1:42.67 min (2009)
 1500 metres – 3:33.68 min (2009)

References

External links
 
 Rosa & Associati profile

1986 births
Living people
Kenyan male middle-distance runners
Olympic athletes of Kenya
Athletes (track and field) at the 2008 Summer Olympics
Olympic bronze medalists for Kenya
World Athletics Championships medalists
Medalists at the 2008 Summer Olympics
Olympic bronze medalists in athletics (track and field)
World Athletics Championships winners
People from Uasin Gishu County